Eriogonum vimineum is a species of wild buckwheat known by the common name wickerstem buckwheat. It is native to the Northwestern United States, California, and Nevada where it is common to abundant in many types of habitat, including the Sierra Nevada.

Description
Eriogonum vimineum is a slender annual herb producing flowering stems up to about 30 centimeters tall surrounded at the bases by rosettes of rounded to oval leaves. The inflorescence is a wide open array of branches lined with clusters of pink to yellowish or white flowers striped with darker midribs.

External links
Jepson Manual Treatment - Eriogonum vimineum
Eriogonum vimineum - Photo gallery

vimineum
Flora of the Northwestern United States
Flora of California
Flora of Nevada
Flora of the Sierra Nevada (United States)
Flora without expected TNC conservation status